Fely Crisóstomo is a Filipina film director and actress. She was the first woman to win the FAMAS Award for Best Director in 1967.

Director – filmography
Kutong lupa – 1976
Gaano kita kamahal – 1968
Kailanma'y di ka mag-iisa – 1968
Oh! My Papa – 1968
Kapag puso'y sinugatan – 1967

Actress – filmography
 1954 – Luneta - LVN Pictures

External links

Possibly living people
Filipino film directors
Filipino women film directors